Erasmus James (born November 4, 1982) is a former American football defensive end.  He played college football at University of Wisconsin, and earned consensus All-American honors.  He was drafted by the Minnesota Vikings 18th overall in the 2005 NFL Draft, and played professionally for the Vikings and the Washington Redskins of the National Football League (NFL).

Early years
James was born in Basseterre, Saint Kitts and Nevis.  He attended McArthur High School in Hollywood, Florida, and was a standout for the McArthur Mustangs high school football and basketball teams.  Despite not playing football until his senior year, he posted 14 quarterback sacks, and 53 tackles (23 for losses) in his only season.

College career

James attended the University of Wisconsin in Madison, and played for the Wisconsin Badgers football team from 2001 to 2004.  He played on the defensive line alongside teammate Anttaj Hawthorne and Jonathan Clinkscale.  He finished his career with 124 tackles (25.5 for losses), 18 sacks, 28 quarterback hurries, seven forced fumbles, two fumble recoveries, and six pass deflections.  James was nicknamed "The Eraser" for his ability to sack opposing quarterbacks.  He was a first-team All-Big Ten selection and was recognized as a consensus first-team All-American following his senior season in 2004.

Professional career

325-pound bench press. 600-pound squat.

Minnesota Vikings
James was drafted by the Minnesota Vikings 18th overall in the 2005 NFL Draft.  During his rookie year, he compiled 28 total tackles and four sacks.  James missed most of the 2006 and 2007 seasons with injuries.  The Vikings made their intentions clear to waive James on May 23, 2008, but later rescinded the waiver after the Washington Redskins offered a conditional 2009 seventh-round draft choice.  He finished his injury-plagued career with the Vikings with 37 tackles and 5 sacks.

Washington Redskins
On May 27, 2008, the Vikings agreed to trade James to the Washington Redskins for a conditional seventh-round pick in the 2009 NFL Draft. He appeared in five games for the Redskins in 2008 but did not record any statistics and was eventually waived on December 9, 2008.

NFL statistics

Personal life
James currently resides in Albuquerque, New Mexico.

References

External links
Minnesota Vikings bio
Washington Redskins bio

1982 births
Living people
People from Basseterre
All-American college football players
American football defensive ends
Minnesota Vikings players
Saint Kitts and Nevis emigrants to the United States
Saint Kitts and Nevis players of American football
Washington Redskins players
Wisconsin Badgers football players
New Mexico Stars players